(alternate name: Kinpachi Kajiwara) was a Japanese film director.

Career
Born in Tokyo, Takizawa worked at Tōa Cinema and Makino Film Productions before debuting as a director in 1929 with Aru onna to gaka. He later directed primarily jidaigeki at Toho and Nikkatsu.

Filmography 
Eisuke Takizawa directed over 80 films:

Director 
 Sengoku gunto-den - Dai ichibu Toraokami (1937)
 Sengoku gunto-den - Dai nibu Akatsuki no zenshin (1937)
 Chinetsu (1938)
 Gozonji Azuma Otoko (1939)
 Nihon kengosen (1945)
 Kirare no senta (1949)
 Hakamadare yasusuke (1952)
 Yudachi kangoro (1953)
 Yasugoro desse (1953)
 Tetsuwan namida ari (1953)
 Kunisada Chūji (1954)
 Rokunin no ansatsusha (1955)
 Kawakami Tetsuharu monogatari sebangō 16 (1957)
 Kajin (1958)
 The Temptress and the Monk (1958)
 Zesshō (1958)

References 

Japanese film directors
1902 births
1965 deaths
People from Tokyo